Rusava is a municipality and village in Kroměříž District in the Zlín Region of the Czech Republic. It has about 600 inhabitants.

Etymology
The village was named after the stream that flows through it. The name of the stream was derived from rusá, i. e. red. The stream was named after red clay, which turns the water red during rains.

Geography
It lies in the Hostýn-Vsetín Mountains. The municipality is situated at the confluence of the streams Rusava and Ráztoka.

History
Rusava was founded in 1657 by Jan Rottal. Until 1918, it was named Rottalovice after its founder.

Economy
Rusava is known as a recreational centre with several larger recreational facilities and hundreds of holiday cottages.

Sport
A ski resort with three ski lifts is located in Rusava.

Sights
A museum with the history of the village is located in Rusava.

References

External links

Villages in Kroměříž District